The 2018 World RX of Great Britain was the fourth round of the fifth season of the FIA World Rallycross Championship. The event was held at Silverstone Circuit in Silverstone, Northamptonshire.

Qualifying

Semi-finals

Semi-Final 1

Semi-Final 2

Final

Standings after the event

 Note: Only the top five positions are included.

References

|- style="text-align:center"
|width="35%"|Previous race:2018 World RX of Belgium
|width="40%"|FIA World Rallycross Championship2018 season
|width="35%"|Next race:2018 World RX of Norway
|- style="text-align:center"
|width="35%"|Previous race:2017 World RX of Great Britain
|width="40%"|World RX of Great Britain
|width="35%"|Next race:Incumbent
|- style="text-align:center"

Great Britain
World RX
World RX